State prosecutor may refer to a prosecutor who works for a state government; see:
District attorney
Public prosecutor
State's attorney

State Prosecutor may also be the name of a specific office, such as:
Prosecutors Office